Kristiene Clarke is a documentary director, producer and academic. She is the first transgender filmmaker in the world to have created documentaries addressing the topic. She has had extensive education and training in various forms of filming and production, and over 70 flagship films to her name since she began directing and producing in 1988. Her work contains themes of cultural, political and sexual diversity and documents the lives and adversity of a variety of people from contrasting backgrounds. Throughout her work she strives to challenge stereotypes and ensure individuals' sexuality and trans identity are not withheld from them. She believes that analysing how the LGBT community is represented via media platforms such as books, TV and film can provide an insight into the contemporary values held within society. Clarke states that there is a popular assumption that transgender individuals are part of a homogeneous group with identical values, and through her filmmaking she aims to unhinge this notion.

Currently she resides in London, England with her dog, Harry and cat, Burt.

Career 
Clarke's career began in 1988 when she directed Sex Change: Shock! Horror! Probe! was aired on Channel 4. Primarily her films are designed to be aired on TV. Many of these have been shown on UK TV channels such as Channel 4, ITV (TV channel), Channel 5 (UK) as well as overseas platforms. Clarke also created work for the award-winning series Arena (TV series) that featured on BBC.

The Truth about Gay Sex (2001) directed by Clarke was screened at the 26th Frameline Film Festival, a San Francisco lesbian and gay film festival in 2002. The 49 minute film shot in Manchester's Gay Village, Canal Street (Manchester), intends to highlight how straight individuals lack knowledge of gay sex and strives to educate its audience with detailed advice and explanations. Tokyo International Lesbian & Gay Film Festival screened Clarke's 1994 documentary Pointing Percy in 1999.

Clarke worked as the event co-ordinater at the Aldeburgh Documentary Film Festival in 2011, which featured the most compelling and thought-provoking documentaries circulating the media at that time. During the festival Clarke's documentary Shantytown Shakespeare (2006) was screened and she conducted a masterclass for students.

Sex Change: Shock! Horror! Probe! (1988) 

The film explores stigma's surrounding transgender individuals as well as documenting their struggle to be considered 'normal' people. The films delves into the cultural and political difficulties of transgender issues within society. It does this by questioning how gender was perceived at the time, as well as showing the process of being transgender after having surgery. The narrative stemmed from Clarke's anger towards the press' interest to know details surrounding Adèle Anderson's sexuality. Clarke says she decided on this title for the documentary in order to "...ridicule the tabloid headlines at the time.".

Clarke said that in the process of making the film and working with the cast that she felt encouraged to reflect upon her own transgender experience and the hardship she faced.

Sandra Bernhard: Confessions of a Pretty Lady (1994) 

This is a mid-length film documenting comedian, Sandra Bernhard which explores various topics such as her sexuality and shows footage of her shoots for Playboy. Clarke showcases the entertainer by giving the audience the chance to "see the real woman behind the fabulous image". In the film Bernhard, her mother, Jeanette, and her aunt and uncle are interviewed. The film was originally made to be aired on the BBC for the documentary series Arena (TV series) however it was taken from the line-up that year.

Academia 
Clarke holds an academic position at the University of Kent teaching 'moving image production', in addition to this she is a mentor at Warnborough College. Clarke has also been a guest lecturer at many other academic institutions such as University of Manchester, University of London, Queen Mary University of London, Royal Holloway, University of London, and London School of Economics. Furthermore, Clarke also delivers masterclasses in cultural institutions worldwide.

Filmography

Awards and nominations 
Kristiene Clarke has received awards for her directing and producing from various International Film Festivals.

References 

Year of birth missing (living people)
Living people
Transgender women
British women film directors
English LGBT people
LGBT film directors